"Division by Zero" is a science fiction short story by American writer Ted Chiang, initially published in 1991 in Full Spectrum 3 magazine and subsequently republished in the 2002 Ted Chiang collection Stories of Your Life and Others.

Plot
Renee, an intellectually gifted mathematician and professor, inadvertently proves arithmetic inconsistent. The discovery causes her great mental anguish, as she can no longer find mathematics intuitively meaningful. Her husband, Carl, is initially sympathetic but finds himself unable to empathize. The stress of her discovery eventually drives Renee to attempt suicide, which Carl prevents. While Renee recovers in a psychiatric ward, Carl realizes he has fallen out of love with her and resolves to end their relationship. The story ends mid-conversation, wherein a grateful Renee, recently released from the ward, attempts to explain her breakdown to a somber Carl.

See also
Division by zero
Infinity
Zero

References

External links
Online text

Science fiction short stories
1991 short stories
Short stories by Ted Chiang